Two Old Women: An Alaskan Legend Of Betrayal, Courage And Survival is a 1993 novel by Velma Wallis, set in northeastern Alaska.

Plot summary 
Long before the Europeans came, nomads roamed the polar region of Alaska in constant search for game. The people of the Gwich'in, who belong to the Athabaska tribes, wander the areas around the Yukon River, the Porcupine River, the Tanana River and their tributaries.

Because of a lack of food and an upcoming strict winter, one of these Gwich'in nomad groups decides to leave behind two old women in the snow-covered wilderness.
Left behind and dumbfounded in fright, 75-year-old Sa' and 80-year-old Ch'idzigyaak remain seated in the snow after the leader announced the decision to the tribe. Before moving on, Ch'idzigyaak's daughter gives them an untanned moose's skin, or babiche. As another familial gesture, Ch'idzigyaak's grandson hides his osseous hatchet, which is the symbol of his manhood, for the two women. The tribe leaves. Left by themselves, the two women at first sit silently. In their desperation, however, they decide it's better to die trying to survive. Sa' succeeds in killing a squirrel using the hatchet as a weapon. The two women boil the meat and drink the broth. They then go on to set rabbit traps and in the middle of the night wake to animal noises: they find two rabbits in their traps. The women now decide to move on to hunt better game. In order to cross the snow, they make themselves snowshoes. Eventually, they reach a river where their tribe had fished successfully in the warmer season. On each night of their journey of several days, the women dig a snow shelter protected by animal hides. They save the embers of their campfires to start a new fire the next evening. In this way, the fire never goes out. In the mornings, the two old women complain about their pains in the joints. Finally they reach their familiar river and set up a winter camp there. However, they hide inland from The People, another tribe, for fear of cannibalism. Fortunately, the two old women succeed in building up a generous supply of food made up of smoked musquashes and beavers. In the summer, they catch large amounts of fish and manage to dry and store them away.

Next winter, the tribe returns to the area. The leader concludes that the two women must have survived because there is no sign of them. He believes that if they can find the women, the tribe might be able to muster a new sense of survival, for his people are starving after having had little hunting luck all through winter. The leader sends off Daagoo, a tracker, and a few young warriors to locate the women. The weak group staggers away. But Daagoo picks up the scent of smoke, and before long they track down the women's camp. The two women at first do not trust the small group but Daagoo gives both of them his word: the men want peace with the two women. Sa' and Ch'idzigyaak hesitate for a long time. In the end they sense that Daagoo is honest. They submit to his request for they had been in fact very lonely, missing their home tribe a lot. However, they do not admit this right away. In spite of their deep mistrust (from having been left alone to die before) their hearts grow soft again. So in the end the two old women deliver rations of food to their own people. Ch'idzigyaak's grandson makes an effort and visits them in the camp, but the daughter is still ashamed and does not visit for a while. In the end, however, the daughter finally visits the mother.

From then on the Gwich'in never ever leave their elderly behind. They will never think of doing that again.

Awards 
 Winner, Western States Book Award, Creative nonfiction, 1993

Editions 
 (reprint 2004)
Velma Wallis: Two Old Women: An Alaskan Legend Of Betrayal, Courage And Survival, The Women's Press Ltd, (UK), 2000, 160 p., 
Velma Wallis: Zwei alte Frauen. Eine Legende von Verrat und Tapferkeit, translated into German by Christel Dormagen 129 p. Munich 1994, .
Velma Wallis: Las dos ancianas, Ediciones B., Barcelona 1996. Translated into Spanish by Javier Alfaya.
Velma Wallis: To kvinder - en Alaska-legende om forræderi, mod og overlevelse. Danish,

References

Note 
This article is based on the corresponding article in the German Wikipedia from 2007-9-30.

1993 American novels
Gwich'in
Novels by Velma Wallis
Novels set in Alaska